Yosef Tzvi Dushinsky (1867 – 17 October 1948), also known as the Maharitz, was the first Rebbe of Dushinsky and Chief Rabbi (Gavad) of the Edah HaChareidis of Jerusalem.

Early life
Dushinsky was born in Paks, Hungary, to Yisroel and Sara Elka Dushinsky. He was a disciple of the author of Shevet Sofer, one of the grandchildren of the Chassam Sofer.

After his marriage to Sheindel, the daughter of Rabbi Mordechai Winkler, author of Levushei Mordechai, Dushinsky became the Chief Rabbi in Galanta, Slovakia. In an epidemic during World War I, his wife died, leaving no children. He subsequently remarried Esther Neuhaus, daughter of Rabbi Yoel Tzvi Neuhaus. He relocated to the town of Chust to assume the position of Chief Rabbi. In 1921, his only child, Yisroel Moshe, was born.

Move to Jerusalem

In 1930, the Dushinsky family moved to the British Mandate of Palestine, settling in Jerusalem. Shortly after in 1932 came the death of the Chief Rabbi and founder of the Edah HaChareidis, Rabbi Yosef Chaim Sonnenfeld. Dushinsky was appointed as his successor. He founded a community of Hungarian Jews in Jerusalem, affiliated with the Perushim section of the Edah HaChareidis. This community gradually developed into a Hasidic dynasty, which is today headed by his grandson, who was named after him.

Dushinsky was known for his strong opposition to Zionism, and spoke to the newly formed United Nations against the creation of the Zionist State.

In fall 1948 Dushinsky was hospitalized in the Shaarei Zedek Hospital on Jaffa Road under the care of Dr. Moshe Wallach, director-general of the hospital. He died on the eve of Sukkot 1948 and was buried in the small cemetery adjacent to the hospital, which was used as a temporary burial ground during the 1948 Arab-Israeli War when the Jewish cemetery on the Mount of Olives was inaccessible. He was succeeded by Rabbi Zelig Reuven Bengis as Chief Rabbi of the Edah HaChareidis, and by his son, Rabbi Yisroel Moshe Dushinsky, as leader of the Dushinsky Hasidim, which would under the latter's leadership turn into one of the newest Hasidic dynasties.

Publications
His Torah commentaries have been published in the Toras Maharitz series.

Maalot Harav Dushinsky
The Jerusalem Municipality sought to honor Dushinsky after his death with the naming of a street, but his son refused for fear that any Shabbat desecration that occurred on the street (e.g. the driving of cars on the Shabbat) would cause pain to his father's soul. After many requests, his son agreed to the naming of a passageway of stairs in the Pagi (Sanhedria) neighborhood after his father, since cars could not access this path.

Rebbes of Dushinsky
Rabbi Yosef Tzvi Dushinsky (1867–1948)
Rabbi Yisroel Moshe Dushinsky (1921–2003), son of Yosef Tzvi Dushinsky
Rabbi Yosef Tzvi Dushinsky, son of Yisroel Moshe Dushinsky

References

Sources

External links
 Chief Rabbi Yosef Tzvi Dushinsky - writings against Zionism

1867 births
1948 deaths
Rebbes of Dushinsky
Rabbis of the Edah HaChareidis
Hasidic rabbis in Israel
Anti-Zionist Hasidic rabbis
Slovak Orthodox rabbis
Hasidic rabbis in Mandatory Palestine